Robert Curzon may refer to:

Robert of Courçon or Robert Curzon ( – 1219), English cardinal of the Roman Catholic Church
Robert Curzon (MP) (1774–1863), MP for Clitheroe 1796–1831
Robert Curzon, 14th Baron Zouche (1810–1873), British traveller
Robert Curzon (died 1550), MP for Cricklade

See also
Robert Curson (1460–1535), medieval bishop